The South Slave Divisional Education Council (SSDEC) is the organizational entity responsible for the administration of public schools within the South Slave Region of the Northwest Territories, Canada. Its responsibility includes all schools within the five communities of the South Slave (with the exception of École Boréale in Hay River). Specifically, it is responsible for schools in the communities of Fort Resolution, Fort Smith, K'atl'odeche First Nation, Hay River, and Łutselk'e. Given the vast distances between communities, and the relatively small populations, the eight schools of the South Slave range in enrolment from 60 to 250 students. Although considered part of the South Slave Region by other departments of the Government of the Northwest Territories, the communities of Fort Providence and Kakisa are served by the Deh Cho Divisional Education Council and not the SSDEC.

Organizational relationships 

The South Slave Divisional Education Council (SSDEC) was created in 1991 alongside five local District Education Authorities (DEAs) in each of the major communities of the South Slave Region. These five DEAs are responsible for setting Council goals and priorities, while the SSDEC is responsible for implementing their decisions within the schools. Both the SSDEC and the five community DEAs are granted power by the Government of the Northwest Territories through the Education Act.

Schools 
 Deninu School in Fort Resolution
 Joseph Burr Tyrrell Elementary School in Fort Smith
 Paul William Kaeser Secondary School in Fort Smith
 Chief Sunrise Education Centre in K'atl'odeche First Nation
 Harry Camsell School in Hay River
 Princess Alexandra School in Hay River
 Diamond Jenness Secondary School in Hay River
 Lutsel K'e Dene School in Łutselk'e

Communities without schools 

While technically within the regional mandate of the SSDEC, the following communities do not host schools for a variety of reasons:
 Fort Reliance, a partially abandoned community east of Lutselk'e.
 Enterprise, due to its small population and close proximity to Hay River.

Leadership for Literacy Initiative 

In an effort to improve literacy outcomes in the region, the SSDEC began implementation of its Leadership for Literacy initiative in 2007. The initiative placed a Literacy Coach in each of the eight schools in the region, providing job-embedded professional development to teachers and training them on research-based skills and strategies to aid in student achievement. The initiative has also moved away from the summative evaluation of students in favour of more frequent formative evaluations so that "instruction can be tailored to the needs to individual students."

Since its implementation, the initiative has seen literacy scores across the region rise significantly, from "less than 50 per cent" in 2005–2006 to 62 per cent in 2017–2018. The Canadian norm is 77 per cent.

Indigenous languages 

The SSDEC is involved with Indigenous language instruction in each of its five communities. According to a report published by the Government of the Northwest Territories, the SSDEC employs 18 Indigenous language instructors who supply over 700 students in the region with daily instruction. Students are instructed in Chipewyan (Dëne Sųłıné Yatıé), Cree (nēhiyawēwin), or South Slavey (Dene Zhatıé), depending on where they live. Typically, students from Hay River and K'atl'odeche First Nation are instructed in South Slavey, while students from Fort Resolution and Lutsel K'e are instructed in Chipewyan. Students in Fort Smith receive instruction in both Cree and Chipewyan. Approximately 90% of students in the South Slave have Indigenous heritage. The Council knows that it is important that students have books that represent their language, culture, communities, and people.

Since 2005, the SSDEC has been developing resources for Indigenous language classrooms. The council has now published more than 300 books, most of them dual-language stories in Chipewyan (Dëne Sųłıné Yatıé), Cree (nēhiyawēwin), or South Slavey (Dene Zhatıé) alongside English. The stories are not meant to replace oral stories, but rather preserve stories and create opportunities for the community to become involved in revitalizing culture and language.

Indigenous language instructors began their involvement in publishing following a set of writing workshops in 2005, following which they wrote many Northern-themed and traditional stories. The publishing process is frequently a community effort, involving locals to write, illustrate, translate, and design the books. The council has also worked with established authors like Richard Van Camp and David Bouchard to publish books; and has worked with other school boards and organizations across the country to translate and publish their stories.

Three Feathers

Three Feathers is a drama film that explores the power and grace of restorative justice and the cultural legacy that can empower future generations. The film was written and directed by Carla Ulrich and is based on the graphic novel Three Feathers[1] by Richard Van Camp[2]. The film, which was produced by the council, premiered in 2018.

The film stars David Burke as Flinch, Joel Evans as Bryce, and Dwight Moses as Rupert; along with Eileen and Henry Beaver as Elders Irene and Raymond. The cast also includes Tantoo Cardinal, Pat Burke, Crystal Benwell, Frankie Laviolette, Dante Kay-Grenier, and Trey Currie.

Children's Storybook Contest

From 2016 to 2020, the Council held an annual Children's Storybook Contest. The contest encouraged residents of Northwest Territories communities to submit stories with Northern themes that lent themselves to translation and illustration. Winners received a cash prize and had their story published in the three Indigenous languages of the region.

First Nations Storybook app

The council has also released three First Nations Storybook apps (in each of the three Indigenous languages taught in the region) for iOS and Android devices. The apps display a bookshelf filled with the children's stories that the council has published, and when a book is opened in the app an audio recording of an Elder reading the story plays. While popular with Indigenous language teachers in the region, the app is also available to download for free through the iTunes and Google Play stores. Apps were released in 2014 (Bush Cree), 2016 (Chipewyan), and 2017 (South Slavey).

"Shopping in Two Worlds" program

In March 2017, the Council rolled out a program called “Shopping in Two Worlds” in Fort Resolution, Fort Smith, K'atl'odeche First Nation, Hay River, and Lutselk'e grocery stores. Common grocery store item names were translated into the Indigenous language(s) of the community, and then the item name was printed on a label along with a QR code that directed to a voice recording of the word. The program has since spread across Canada, with The North West Company working with Elders, translators, and community members across the country to translate sets of words into approximately 30 different dialects to publish on grocery store labels in the communities the stores serve.

Dictionaries

In 2008, the Council published a South Slavey-to-English dictionary, developed in partnership with the K’atl’odeeche First Nation. In March 2012, the Council produced, in collaboration with a group of community leaders from Fort Resolution, a Chipewyan-to-English dictionary.[6] In 2013, the Council produced a second Chipewyan-to-English dictionary with the community of Lutsel K’e. The 400-page Lutsel K’e version includes an additional 1,200 words and images. As dialects vary from community to community, the two Chipewyan dictionaries reflect the language of their respective communities. All dictionaries come with a CD containing clickable words that voice proper pronunciation.

“Strong Like Two People” music video

In 2009, the Council produced a music video called “Strong Like Two People.” The song was written by Cree hip hop artist Shawn Bernard (FEENIX) and features students from Fort Smith, Hay River, and Fort Resolution schools. The song won the 2010 Canadian Aboriginal Music Award for “Best Rap/Hip Hop Music Video.”

"Scramble" Game
Paul Boucher, a Chipewyan teacher in Fort Smith, created a Scrabble-like game called "Ɂëk’éch’a Helá" or "Scramble." The board is labelled in Chipewyan, e.g. "Ta Yati" for "Triple Word Score", and the tiles are labelled not with the letters of the English alphabet but with the grapheme sequences of Chipewyan. For example, there are tiles labelled "ddh" since that sequence represents a single sound in Chipewyan. Following the success of "Chipewyan Scramble," the SSDEC further developed the game to include letter tiles so it could be played in any of the nine official Indigenous language categories of the Northwest Territories.

Recognition

References

School districts in the Northwest Territories